Spectral bands are parts of the electromagnetic spectrum of specific wavelengths, which can be filtered by a standard filter. In nuclear physics, spectral bands are referred to the emission of polyatomic systems, including condensed materials, large molecules, etc. Each spectral line corresponds to one level in the atom splits in the molecules. When the number of atoms is large, one gets a continuum of energy levels, the so-called "spectral bands". They are often labeled in the same way as the monatomic lines.

The bands may overlap. In general, the energy spectrum can be given by a density function, describing the number of energy levels of the quantum system for a given interval. Spectral bands have constant density, and when the bands overlap, the corresponding densities are added.

Band spectra is the name given to a group of lines that are closely spaced and arranged in a regular sequence that appears to be a band. It is a colored band, separated by dark spaces on the two sides and arranged in a regular sequence. In one band, there are various sharp and wider color lines, that are closer on one side and wider on other. The intensity in each band falls off from definite limits and indistinct on the other side. In complete band spectra, there is a number lines in a band.

This spectra is produced when the emitting substance is in the molecular state. Therefore, they are also called molecular spectra.

It is emitted by a molecule in vacuum tube, C-arc core with metallic salt. The band spectrum is the combination of many different spectral lines, resulting from molecular vibrational, rotational, and electronic transition.

Spectroscopy studies spectral bands for astronomy and other purposes.

See also
 Band emission

Spectroscopy